Acidiplasma is a genus in the phylum Euryarchaeota (Archaea).

Etymology
The name Acidiplasma derives from:New Latin neuter gender n acidum, an acid; Greek neuter gender noun plasma (πλάσμα), something shaped or moulded; New Latin neuter gender noun Acidiplasma, an acid-living form.

Species
The genus contains 3 species (including basonyms and synonyms), namely
 A. aeolicum ( Golyshina et al. 2009,  (Type species of the genus).; Latin neuter gender adjective aeolicum, from the Aeolian archipelago, to which Vulcano Island belongs, where the type strain was isolated.)
 A. cupricumulans ( (Hawkes et al. 2008) Golyshina et al. 2009, ; Latin noun cuprum, copper; Latin participle adjective cumulans, heaping up, accumulating; New Latin participle adjective cupricumulans, copper-accumulating.)

See also
 Bacterial taxonomy 
 Microbiology

References 

Archaea genera
Euryarchaeota